Donald Andrew John Cameron MSP (born 26 November 1976) is a Scottish Conservative Party politician, who has been a Member of the Scottish Parliament (MSP) for the Highlands and Islands region since 2016. He currently serves as the Scottish Conservative's Shadow Cabinet Secretary for the Constitution, External Affairs and Culture since May 2021.

Background
Donald Cameron was educated at Harrow School and graduated with a first-class honours degree in modern history from Oriel College, Oxford and a Diploma in Law from City University London. He worked as an advocate for 10 years before his election and acted for a range of clients in public, agricultural and crofting law.

Cameron stood as the Scottish Conservative candidate in the Ross, Skye and Lochaber constituency, coming fourth in the 2010 general election; he came third contesting Orkney and Shetland in 2015.

In 2016, Cameron stood as a candidate at Argyll and Bute for the Scottish Parliament and finished third, but was subsequently elected as the Conservatives' third placed candidate on the Highlands and Islands regional list. He was appointed by the party as their 'Shadow Cabinet Secretary for Health and Sport'.

In 2017, Cameron was appointed the Scottish Conservatives' 2021 Policy Co-ordinator.

In February 2020, Cameron was appointed Shadow Cabinet Secretary for Finance by the Scottish Conservative Leader Jackson Carlaw.

In August 2020, Cameron was appointed Shadow Cabinet Secretary for Health and Sport by the new Leader of the Scottish Conservatives Douglas Ross. In May 2021, he was appointed Shadow Cabinet Secretary for the Constitution, External Affairs and Culture.

Cameron helped re-establish the Cross Party Group on Health Inequalities and was one of three co-convenors of the group until May 2021. He remains a member of the group. He is Co-convenor of the Cross Party Group on MS and he is the vice-convenor of the Cross Party Group on Gàidhlig. He also sits on various other cross-party groups including those on Beer & Pubs and Crofting.

On 12 January 2022, Cameron joined his leader Ross in calling for Boris Johnson to resign as Conservative party leader and Prime Minister over the Westminster lockdown parties controversy along with a majority of Scottish Conservative MSPs.

Ancestry

References

External links 
 

1976 births
Living people
People educated at Harrow School
Alumni of Oriel College, Oxford
Alumni of City, University of London
Conservative MSPs
Members of the Scottish Parliament 2016–2021
Members of the Scottish Parliament 2021–2026
Place of birth missing (living people)
Members of the Faculty of Advocates
People from Lochaber
Donald